Rising Tide is a debut album by the progressive bluegrass band Chesapeake.

Track listing

 "Black Jack Davey" (Traditional) 3:19  
 "The Morning Blues" (Traditional) 3:43  
 "Columbus Stockade" (Traditional) 3:56  
 "Darcey Farrow" (Tom Campbell, Steve Gillette) 5:26  
 "Dreamer Believer" (Harvey Reid) 3:16  
 "High Sierras" (Harley Allen) 4:12  
 "Always on a Mountain" (Chuck Howard) 2:45  
 "Cypress Grove" (Traditional) 3:20  
 "Genie in the Wine" (T. Michael Coleman) 3:07  
 "2:10 Train" (Linda Albertano, Tom Campbell) 4:08  
 "Summer Wages" (Ian Tyson) 5:35  
 "Shady Grove" (Traditional) 2:38  
 "Moondance" (Van Morrison) 4:17

Personnel
 Moondi Klein - lead vocals, guitar, piano
 Mike Auldridge - Dobro, lap steel, pedal steel, guitar, vocals
 Jimmy Gaudreau - mandolin, guitar, vocals
 T. Michael Coleman - bass guitar, guitar, vocals

with
 Pat McInerney - percussion, drums

References

External links

1994 debut albums
Sugar Hill Records albums